François Baillairgé (21 January 1759 – 15 September 1830) was an architect who also pursued painting and wood sculpture. 
 
The son of Jean Baillairgé, François began an apprenticeship in his father's shop at the age of 14. There he studied and practised woodworking, wood-carving, and architecture. His brother, Pierre-Florent, was also active as a carver and joiner in the business. He also studied at the Petit Séminaire de Québec and then studied in Paris for three years, returning to Lower Canada in 1781. His training in Paris, although not completed, gave him a strong foundation in painting, sculpture, and architecture.

A great deal of his work was in the field of painting and he was very productive although he did not achieve a level of success that matched his ambition. He had a high level of achievement as a wood-carver in architectural projects working through his father's workshop.

By 1815, he had introduced his son, Thomas, into the family business and they produced some substantial work together. François also produced many plans for a variety of clients in his work as an architect.

Works

References

External links 
 Biography at the Dictionary of Canadian Biography Online

1759 births
1830 deaths
19th-century Canadian architects